Málkov is a municipality and village in Chomutov District in the Ústí nad Labem Region of the Czech Republic. It has about 900 inhabitants.

Administrative parts
Villages of Lideň, Vysoká and Zelená are administrative parts of Málkov.

References

External links

Villages in Chomutov District